"Fuck the Industry" (censored as "F**k the Industry") is a song recorded by American singer Solange. The song leaked online in 2008 and was reported to be part of a mixtape recorded by Solange called I Can't Get Clearance. However, the mixtape was never released and the song received an official release in 2010. The song was released to digital music stores on May 25, 2010, on her father Mathew Knowles's Music World Entertainment, after Solange was dropped by Geffen Records and received no promotion. The single includes remixes of "Fuck the Industry" and remixes of two songs from Sol-Angel and the Hadley St. Dreams. The song's main sample comes from American rapper and producer Kanye West's "Everything I Am" from his third studio album, Graduation (2007).

The song's lyrics deal with Solange wanting to be her own person/artist individually and makes references to fellow female R&B artists such as her famous older sister, Mary J. Blige, Ashanti, Keyshia Cole and Jennifer Lopez.

Track listing
Digital download (Dance Remixes)
"Fuck the Industry" (DJ Escape/Coluccio Main) – 7:34
"Fuck the Industry" (DJ Escape/Coluccio Dub) – 6:20
"Fuck the Industry" (Lost Daze remix) – 6:33
"Fuck the Industry" (Lost Daze edit) – 3:43
"6 O'Clock Blues" (Whatever Wherever Mix) – 7:41
"6 O'Clock Blues" (Whatever Wherever Radio) – 4:05
"Cosmic Journey" (Matty's Club Mix) – 8:34
"Cosmic Journey" (Matty's Radio) – 4:11

Charts

Release history

References

2008 songs
2010 singles
Solange Knowles songs
Songs written by Chuck D
Songs written by Eric "Vietnam" Sadler
Songs written by George Clinton (funk musician)
Songs written by Hank Shocklee
Songs written by Kanye West
Songs written by Solange Knowles